Harary is a popular last name of Jews of Moroccan and Syrian descent.  Many Moroccan Jews upon emigration to Israel in the 1950s hebraicised the original surname, Elharar, to Harary. Harary may refer to:

 Charlie Harary, American investor, strategic adviser and professor 
 Frank Harary, American graph theorist
 Goldner–Harary graph, a simple undirected graph with 11 vertices and 27 edges
 Harary's generalized tic-tac-toe
 Franz Harary (?-?)
 Ronnen Harary, Canadian billionaire businessman
 Joseph M Harary, CEO of smartglass company Research Frontiers (SmartGlass.com)

See also
 Harari (disambiguation)